Aqyus is a sub-district located in the Shar'ab as-Salam District, Taiz Governorate, Yemen. Aqyus had a population of 5,476 according to the 2004 census.

References

Sub-districts in Shar'ab as-Salam District